Gilded Age mansions were lavish houses built between 1870 and the early 20th century by some of the richest people in the United States.

These estates were raised by the nation's industrial, financial and commercial elite, who amassed great fortunes in era of expansion of the tobacco, railroad, steel, and oil industries coinciding with a lack of both governmental regulation and the absence of a personal income tax. The manor homes and city seats were designed by prominent architects of the day and decorated with antiquities, furniture, and works of art from the world over.

Many of the wealthy had undertaken grand tours of Europe, during which they admired the estates of the nobility. Seeing themselves as their American equivalent, they wished to emulate the old world dwellings on American soil, and spent extravagantly to do so, often seeking to one-up each other. Concentrations of such homes developed in the financial centers and resorts of the Northeast, the industrial heartland of the upper Midwest, and in the rapidly expanding regions of the West Coast, with vacations homes also appearing prominently in Florida.

Alabama

Arizona

Arkansas

California

Colorado

Connecticut

Delaware

District of Columbia

Florida

Georgia

Illinois

Iowa

Maine

Maryland

Massachusetts

Michigan

Minnesota

Mississippi

Missouri

Montana

New Jersey

New York

New York City

North Carolina

Ohio

Oregon

Pennsylvania

Rhode Island

South Carolina

Tennessee

Texas

Utah

Vermont

Virginia

Washington

Wisconsin

See also

 American architecture
 List of largest houses in the United States

References

 

Gilded Age
Gilded Age
Gilded Age
Luxury real estate